This is a list of government bodies, agencies, institutions and other corporations related to the tourism in China.

Industry

 China National Tourism Administration (CNTA), is a government agency in charge of tourism. The agency is directly affiliated to the State Council.
 China Tourism Association, or known as the China National Tourism Institute, is the first industry association for tourism in China. It is established in 1986, directly affiliated to the CNTA.

Academic and education

 Beijing Tourism Institute, officially known as the School of Tourism of Beijing Union University, the former satellite campus of Beijing International Studies University taken over by BUU in 1983.
 China Tourism Academy (CTA), established in 2008, is a research institute under the CNTA. The institute is located in Beijing, China.
 China Tourism Institute refers to Beijing International Studies University, especially during the 1980s and the 1990s.
 China Tourism Education (CTE), established in 2008 under the China Tourism Association. It is merged from the National Association of Secondary Tourism Education and National Association of Tertiary Tourism Education, which were established in 1980s.
 China Tourism Management Institute (CTMT), a TAFE agency for vocational and educational training, located in Tianjin, China, established in 1987 under the CNTA.
 Institute for Tourism Studies is a public institution of higher education in Macau, China. It is administered by the Secretary for Social Affairs and Culture of the Macau SAR Government.

Publishing houses

 China Tourism News Office is the newspaper office affiliated with CNTA. It publishes the newspaper China Tourism News and runs its e-version online website. Besides, it established Top Tour, a service platform for domestic travels.
 China Travel and Tourism Press (CTTP), established in 1975 under the CNTA, is China's biggest professional publishing house for tourism.
 Tourism Education Press (TEP), established in 1987, is the university press of Beijing International Studies University.

References 

Tourism in China
China